Michael DiBiase (December 24, 1923 – July 2, 1969) was an American professional wrestler, also known by his ring name "Iron" Mike DiBiase. The adoptive father of professional wrestler "The Million Dollar Man" Ted DiBiase, he was married to Ted's mother Helen Hild (also a professional wrestler), and was the grandfather of Mike, Ted Jr., and Brett DiBiase.

Amateur wrestling career 
As an amateur wrestler, DiBiase, representing the US Navy, was the 1946 AAU champion in the UNL (open or heavyweight) division. He then wrestled at the University of Nebraska, and competed at UNL in the NCAA tournament in 1947 and 1948, losing his first round match both years.

Professional wrestling career 
DiBiase made his professional debut in 1950. In 1963, DiBiase became the 131st and last knockout victim of light heavyweight boxer Archie Moore. One of DiBiase's most notable matches was a Texas Death Match against Dory Funk Sr, which according to Terry Funk lasted for four hours and 10 minutes, having taken in 32 falls.

Death 
DiBiase died in the ring on July 2, 1969, in Lubbock, Texas, following a match with Man Mountain Mike as the result of a fatal heart attack. Harley Race performed CPR on DiBiase and then rode in the ambulance with him. DiBiase was pronounced dead at the hospital. He was buried at the Sunset Cemetery in Willcox, Arizona. Ted DiBiase confirmed that his father had a huge cholesterol buildup and was genetically predisposed to heart disease.

Championships and accomplishments 
 American Wrestling Association
 AWA Midwest Heavyweight Championship (3 times)
 AWA Midwest Tag Team Championship (2 times) – with Bob Orton (1) and The Avenger (1)
 George Tragos/Lou Thesz Professional Wrestling Hall of Fame
 Class of 2006
 Central States Wrestling
 NWA Central States Heavyweight Championship (3 times)
 Championship Wrestling from Florida
 NWA Brass Knuckles Championship (Florida version) (1 time)
 NWA Southern Heavyweight Championship (Florida version) (1 time)
 Fred Kohler Enterprises
 NWA World Tag Team Championship (Chicago Version) (1 time) – with Danny Plechas
 NWA Rocky Mountain
 NWA Rocky Mountain Heavyweight Championship (1 time)
 NWA Rocky Mountain Tag Team Championship (2 times) – with Freddie Blassie and Juan Garcia
 NWA Tri-State
 NWA World Junior Heavyweight Championship (1 time)
 Pacific Northwest Wrestling
 NWA Pacific Northwest Heavyweight Championship (1 time)
 Southwest Sports, Inc.
 NWA Brass Knuckles Championship (Texas version) (1 time)
 NWA Texas Tag Team Championship (2 times) – with Danny Plechas
 Western States Sports
 NWA International Tag Team Championship (Amarillo version) (1 time) – with Danny Plechas
 NWA North American Heavyweight Championship (Amarillo version) (3 times)
 NWA North American Tag Team Championship (Amarillo version) (4 times) – with Danny Plechas (2), Dr. X (1), and Fritz Von Erich (1)
 NWA Southwest Junior Heavyweight Championship (1 time)
 NWA World Tag Team Championship (Amarillo version) (4 times) - with Art Nelson (1) and Danny Plechas (3)
 NWA World Tag Team Championship (Amarillo version) Tournament (1957) - with Danny Plechas
 Worldwide Wrestling Associates
 WWA Americas Heavyweight Championship (1 time)
 WWA World Heavyweight Championship (1 time)
 WWA World Tag Team Championship (3 times) – with Killer Karl Kox (1) and Karl Gotch (2)

See also 
 List of premature professional wrestling deaths

References

External links 
 

1923 births
1969 deaths
20th-century Italian male actors
American male professional wrestlers
American professional wrestlers of Italian descent
Nebraska Cornhuskers wrestlers
Professional wrestling deaths
Sports deaths in Texas
Stampede Wrestling alumni
20th-century professional wrestlers
Professional wrestlers from New York City
NWA World Junior Heavyweight Champions
NWA Brass Knuckles Champions (Florida version)
WCWA Brass Knuckles Champions
NWA Americas Tag Team Champions
NWA Americas Heavyweight Champions